This is a list of notable alumni of Tonbridge School.

Academics and scientists
 Robert McNeill Alexander, CBE, FRS, Professor of Zoology at the University of Leeds 
 Sir Derek Harold Richard Barton, FRS, chemist and Nobel Laureate
 William Thomas Clifford Beckett, CBE, DSO (1862–1956) brigadier-general in British Army and notable civil engineer
 Herbert Edward Douglas Blakiston, Vice-Chancellor of the University of Oxford (1917–1920)
 Roland Bond, locomotive engineer
 Henry Burton, physician and chemist
 Ian Bradley, writer, academic and theologian
 James Burton, Egyptologist
 Owen Chadwick, Order of Merit, Vice Chancellor of University of Cambridge, Master of Selwyn Cambridge, Regius Professor of Modern History, Dixie Professor of Ecclesiastical History, Chancellor of University of Anglia, President of British Academy, and a Rugby Union international
 John George Children, FRS British chemist, mineralogist and zoologist
 Homersham Cox (mathematician), mathematician
 Sir John Crofton, respiratory physician and expert on treatment of Tuberculosis
 David Emms, teacher and rugby union player
 Peter Fisher, personal physician to Her Majesty Queen Elizabeth II
 W. D. Hamilton, devisor of Red Queen Theory
 Norman Heatley, the man who, having been on the team of Oxford scientists which discovered penicillin, turned it into a usable medicine
 Norman Gerald Horner, physician and medical journalist
 R. J. B. Knight, naval historian
 Sir Arthur Marshall, aviation engineer
 Edward Nicholson, author and head of the Bodleian library
 Walter Fraser Oakeshott, Vice Chancellor of the University of Oxford
 Jack Ogden, archaeologist and historian focusing on the development of jewellery materials and techniques
 Carl Pantin, FRS, professor of Zoology, Cambridge University
 Colin Patterson, palaeontologist and reformer of the fossil record
 Sir David Randall Pye, FRS, mechanical engineer and Provost of University College London
 W. H. R. Rivers, Cambridge neurologist, psychologist, anthropologist and World War One psychiatrist
 Sir Anthony Seldon, historian, political commentator and educationalist (current Master of Wellington College)
 Claud Buchanan Ticehurst, ornithologist
 Ernest Basil Verney, pharmacologist and Fellow of the Royal Society
 Thomas Dewar Weldon philosopher
 Maurice Frank Wiles, Regius Professor Emeritus of Divinity at Oxford and one of the leading theologians of the Church of England
 E. T. C. Werner, diplomat and China scholar

Actors, directors, producers & screenwriters
 Maurice Denham (1909–2002), prolific character actor, known for voicing all the animal characters in the animated feature Animal Farm and also for the part of Maigret in the 1970s radio production of that name
 Tristan Gemmill (born 1967), actor, known for playing Adam Trueman in the BBC medical drama Casualty 
 Will Hislop, actor and comedian
 Ronald Howard (1918–1996) actor, son of Leslie Howard
 John Howlett (born 1942), screenwriter & film director, co-wrote the feature film If.... with fellow Tonbridge schoolmate David Sherwin
 Adrian Rawlins (born 1958), actor, known for playing James Potter in the Harry Potter film series
 Paul Rutman, producer and writer, including TV series Indian Summers and eight episodes of Vera
 Dan Stevens (born 1982), actor, known for playing Matthew Crawley in the ITV period drama Downton Abbey
 David Sherwin (born 1942), screenwriter, co-wrote the feature film If.... with fellow Tonbridge schoolmate John Howlett
 David Tomlinson (1917–2000), actor, known for playing George Banks in Mary Poppins
 Benjamin Whitrow (born 1937), actor, known for playing Mr. Bennett in the 1995 mini-series Pride and Prejudice

Armed forces
 Lieutenant General Sir Richard Anderson KCB, CBE, DSO 
 Clifford Thomason Beckett, CBE, MC, major-general in British Army
 Colonel Hamish de Bretton-Gordon, chemical weapons expert
 Rear Admiral David Cooke, submarine and defence procurement officer
 William Sholto Douglas, 1st Baron Douglas of Kirtleside, GCB, MC, DFC, Commander-in-Chief of Fighter Command after the Battle of Britain
 Eric Stuart Dougall, Victoria Cross, First World War
 Lieutenant General Sir Arthur Dowler
 Air Chief Marshal Sir William Elliot GCVO, KCB, KBE, DFC & Bar, ADC, RAF
 John Everard Gurdon DFC and bar. WW1 flying ace with 28 kills
 Rear Admiral Frederick Hervey, 4th Marquess of Bristol, nobleman, naval officer and Conservative politician
 John Holman, CBE, brigadier in British Army 
 Squadron Leader Hilary Hood, Battle of Britain fighter pilot
 Edmund Ironside, 1st Baron Ironside, Chief of the Imperial General Staff
 Edmund Ironside, 2nd Baron Ironside
 Major-General Sir Millis Jefferis, developer of unusual weapons during WW2
 Harold Stephen Langhorne (1877–1878), brigadier-general in the British Army in the First World War
 James Archibald Dunboyne Langhorne (1893–1896), brigadier in the British Army
 Gyles Longley, awarded the Military Cross for actions in Italy
 Charles Mordaunt, 3rd Earl of Peterborough, a brilliant soldier and notorious eccentric who captured Barcelona in the war of Spanish Succession
 Lieutenant-Commander Harold Newgass GC, recipient of the George Cross
 Wing Commander Eric James Brindley Nicolson, VC, DFC, Battle of Britain fighter pilot and recipient of the Victoria Cross
 Major Sandy Smith (British Army officer), awarded the Military Cross for action at Pegasus Bridge
 Admiral Sir William Sidney Smith, KCB, GCTE, the British admiral of whom Napoleon Bonaparte said, "That man made me miss my destiny"
 Trevor Sidney Wade DFC AFC, Battle of Britain fighter pilot and ace
 Air Chief Marshal Sir Andrew 'Sandy' Wilson, Former Air Member for Personnel and last C-in-C RAF Germany
 Robert Charles Zaehner, British academic, wartime SOE agent and post war MI6 agent

Business
 Sir John Bond, former chairman of HSBC and current chairman of Vodafone
 Roy Brown, former chairman of GKN
 Gerald Corbett, businessman
 Sir Brian Garton Jenkins, chairman of Woolwich plc
 Sir David Kirch, businessman
 Bevil Mabey, chairman of Mabey Group
 Michael Marriott, head of the British stock exchange
 Alex Proud (born 1969), founder and CEO of The Proud Group
 Sir Tim Waterstone (born 1939), founder of Waterstones bookshops

Church leaders
 William Alexander (bishop) (1824–1911) poet, theologian and Anglican Primate of All Ireland
 George Austen, clergyman and father of Jane Austen
 Harry Blackburne , Dean of Bristol
 Gerald Brooks, Anglican Bishop
 Philip Stanhope Dodd, Anglican clergyman
 Timothy Dudley-Smith, Bishop and hymn writer
 Charles Escreet, Archdeacon of Lewisham
 Edward Lewis Evans, Bishop of Barbados
 Andrew Graham, Bishop of Newcastle
 Sidney Faithorn Green, Ritualist clergyman
 John Halliburton, theologian
 Joseph Charles Hoare, an eminent Anglican priest in Hong Kong
 Bishop Frederick Ridgeway
 Arthur Tooth SSC, Anglo-Catholic clergyman prosecuted for using ritualist liturgical practices
 Hugo Ferdinand de Waal, Principal of Ridley Hall, Cambridge and Bishop of Thetford
 Henry Russell Wakefield was an Anglican Bishop and author
 Geoffrey Warde, Anglican Bishop
 Kenneth Warner, Bishop of Edinburgh
 Cecil Wilson, Bishop of Melanesia

Politicians
 Austen Albu, Labour MP
 Geoffrey Bing, Labour MP
 John Bowis, former Conservative MP and MEP, a Health Minister 1993-96 and a Transport Minister 1996-97
 Iain Coleman, Labour MP
 Charles Conybeare, radical Liberal politician
 Harold Cox, Liberal MP
 Sampson Gideon, later Eardley, 1st Baron Eardley, Jewish-born 18th century Tory MP, created a Baronet in 1759 while a schoolboy
 John Ganzoni, 1st Baron Belstead, Conservative MP
 The Hon. Ben Gummer, Conservative MP for Ipswich
 Sir Reginald Hanson, 1st Baronet, Kt, JP, DL, FSA was Lord Mayor of London and a British Conservative Party politician.
 Sir Anthony Hart, Lord Chancellor of Ireland 1827-1830
 Thomas Herbert, 8th Earl of Pembroke, Lord Privy Seal
 Edward Brodie Hoare, British Conservative politician
 Sir Norman Hulbert, RAF officer and Conservative politician
 Nawab Mohammad Ismail Khan, (politician), signatory to the Indian Constitution
 Lord Mayhew of Twysden, QC, barrister and Conservative politician
 Ralph Neville, Liberal Unionist politician
 Sydney Olivier, 1st Baron Olivier (1859–1943), colonial civil servant and Cabinet Minister
 Thomas Pelham, 1st Baron Pelham, aristocrat, Whig Party politician, father of two Prime Ministers
 Sir Julian Ridsdale, Conservative politician and intelligence officer 
 George Smythe, 7th Viscount Strangford, Conservative politician
 Sir Peter Tapsell, Conservative politician, MP for Louth & Horncastle
 Charles Wardle, Conservative politician

Diplomats and civil servants
 Sir Sherard Cowper-Coles, diplomat
 Sir Henry Mortimer Durand diplomat, former Ambassador to the United States
Sir Walter Egerton, colonial governor
 Sir Basil Engholm, civil servant
 Dominic Jermey, British Ambassador to Afghanistan
 Sir John Leahy, KCMG, British Ambassador to South Africa
 Sir William Marwood, civil servant
 Henry Thoby Prinsep, English official of the Indian civil service
 Robert Rogers, Baron Lisvane, Clerk of the House of Commons
Sir Leslie Rowan, civil servant 
 Sir David Trench, Governor of Hong Kong (1964–1971)
 David Williamson, Baron Williamson of Horton GCMG, CB, PC, Secretary General of the European Commission
 Charles Whitworth, 1st Earl Whitworth, British Ambassador to Paris during the treaty of Amiens

Entertainers and musicians
 Robert Ashfield Organist of Southwell Minster and Rochester Cathedral
 Bill Bruford, Drummer for Yes, King Crimson and others (musician)
 Justin Chancellor, bassist, Tool
 Tom Chaplin, Keane musician
 Julian Clifford, Conductor
 Kit Hesketh-Harvey, musician
 Richard Hughes, Keane musician
 Joseph McManners left in 2011, Singer and actor
 Tim Rice-Oxley, Keane musician
 King Palmer, composer
 Dominic Scott musician, founding member of the band Keane
 Andy Zaltzman, stand-up comedian

Journalists and writers

 Andy Bell, journalist
 Mark Church, sports commentator
 Harry Cole, journalist
 Homersham Cox, author and county judge
 Rupert Croft-Cooke, author
 Albany Fonblanque, journalist
 E. M. Forster, novelist
 Frederick Forsyth, novelist
 Sidney Keyes, poet
 Nicholas Ostler, linguist
 Matthew Parker, author
 Christopher Reid, poet
 Vikram Seth, novelist
 Jonathan Street, novelist
 Arthur Watkyn, author and Secretary of the British Board of Film Censors 
 Ken Wiwa, journalist and author. Son of Nigerian campaigner, Ken Saro-Wiwa.
 William Woodfall, (at the school in 1760), pioneer of the (then illegal) practice of reporting Parliamentary debates

Miscellaneous
 William Adams, lawyer
 Khalid bin Sultan Al Qasimi, fashion designer
 Aleister Crowley, occultist, mystic, sexual revolutionary
 Ranulph Bacon, senior police officer
 Sir Herbert Baker, architect
 Murray Beauclerk, 14th Duke of St Albans
 Martin Beddoe, judge
 Sir Rupert de la Bère, 1st Baronet
 Decimus Burton, 19th century architect 
 Hugh Cecil - 1920s society photographer
 Gerald Cock, British broadcasting executive
 Julius Cowdrey, musician, reality television personality 
 Peter Fincham, Director of TV at ITV, former Controller of BBC One
 Harold Gilman, painter
 Adrian Greenwood, historian and art dealer
 Sir Robert Heath, Attorney-General under King Charles I 
 Chris Hollins - BBC Breakfast sports presenter, son of footballer John Hollins
 William Hughes-Hughes, stamp-collector
 George Percy Jacomb-Hood, artist
 Vikram Jayanti, documentary film maker
 Sir Guy Newey, Lord Justice of Appeal.
 Sir John Nott-Bower, Commissioner of Police of the Metropolis
 Jasper Rootham, civil servant, soldier, central banker, merchant banker, writer and poet
 Tim Severin, explorer
 Colin Smith, judge
 George Smythe, 7th Viscount Strangford
 Paul Tanqueray - society photographer
 Francis Thynne, herald (his father was Chaucer's editor, and Master of the Household for Henry VIII)
 David Trubridge, furniture designer
 Dr. Edward Whitehead Reid, surgeon and aviator
 Roger Yates, Organ builder
 Keith Young, hospital and school sanatoria architect

Sportsmen
 John Abercrombie, cricketer
 David Aers, cricketer
 William Albertini (1913–1994), English cricketer
 Mark Allbrook, cricketer and Head at Bloxham School
 Jonathan Arscott, cricketer and schoolmaster
 Randolph Aston, rugby union international who represented England
 Matthew Banes, cricketer
 Jack Barley, cricketer
 James Body, rugby union international who represented England
 Thomas Bourdillon, cricketer
 Frederick Capron, cricketer
 William Cave, England rugby union player
 Sir Colin Cowdrey, Baron Cowdrey of Tonbridge (1932–2000), Kent CCC and England cricketer and cricket administrator
 C. S. Cowdrey (born 1957), Kent Glamorgan and England cricketer and broadcaster
 Fabian Cowdrey, Kent cricketer
 G. R. Cowdrey (born 1964), Kent cricketer
 Tom Crawford, cricketer
 Zak Crawley, Kent and England cricketer
 John Dale, cricketer
 Charles Daniel-Tyssen, cricketer
 Jack Davies, cricketer who bowled Sir Donald Bradman out for a duck
 David Day, cricketer
 John Dew, cricketer
 Ben Earl, Saracens and England Rugby Union player
 Tom Elliott, cricketer
 Charles Ellison, cricketer
 Richard Ellison (born 1959), Kent CCC and England cricketer
 Edward Estridge, cricketer
 Thomas Francis, cricketer
 Peter Graham, cricketer
 Alexander Grimes, cricketer
 Johnny Hammond, rugby player
 Lionel Hedges, cricketer
 Anthony Henniker-Gotley, England rugby union captain
 Alexander Hore, cricketer
 Mark Hickson, cricketer
 John Holman, first-class cricketer
 Maurice Holmes, cricketer
 C. W. H. Howard (born 1904), Middlesex CCC cricketer
 Frederick Hutchings, county cricketer
 Kenneth Hutchings, England cricketer and Wisden cricketer of the year
 William Hutchings, county cricketer
 Edward Hyde, Cambridge sportsman
 Nick Kemp, county cricketer
 Francis Luscombe (1849–1926), rugby union international who represented England and was on the first Rugby Football Union committee
 David Marques, England and British Lions rugby player and member of 1964 America's Cup challenger team aboard the yacht Sovereign.
 James Mason (1876–1938), cricketer
 Tom May, rugby union player, Newcastle Falcons and England
 Richard O'Grady, cricketer
 Marcus O'Riordan, cricketer
 Frank Orr, cricketer
 Jamie Parker, cricketer
 Toby Pettman, cricketer
 Charles Pillman , England Rugby player
 Roger Prideaux, cricketer
 James Pyemont, cricketer
 Ben Ransom, Rugby union player for Saracens
 Henry Reade, cricketer
 Henry Richardson, cricketer
 Septimus Ridsdale, cricketer
 James Rowe, cricketer
 Ronald Rutter, cricketer
 George Arbuthnot Scott, cricketer
 Walter Slade, (1854–1919), former world amateur record holder for the mile
 Noel Sherwell, cricketer
 James Short (rugby union), Rugby union player for Saracens.
 Leonard Shuter, cricketer
 Colin Smith, cricketer
 E. T. Smith (born 1977), Middlesex CCC, Kent and England cricketer
 John Thompson, cricketer
 David Toft, cricketer
 John Vigurs, Olympic rower
 John Vernon (1922–1994), first-class cricketer and Royal Navy sailor
 Luke Wallace, Rugby player for Harlequins RFC
 Chris Walsh, cricketer
 Alfred Wilkins, cricketer

References

Lists of people by English school affiliation
 
Old Tonbr